HD 36112 is a Herbig Ae star located in the constellation Taurus and the young star is surrounded by irregular rings of cosmic dust. The system is about 3.5 million years old. The disk has a cavity at 50 astronomical units and two spiral arms at 30-75 au that are seen in near-infrared scattered light, but only one spiral arm is seen in ALMA images.

The inner cavity was shown to be elliptical and not perfectly circular. This is not a projection effect but represents the shape of the cavity, with an eccentricity e ≈  0.1 after the deprojection of the disk.

The observations with ALMA have also shown evidence of an unseen exoplanet at 100 au. Another study came to the conclusion that a 1.5  planet at 35 au and a 5  planet at 140 au could explain the features seen with ALMA and the VLA. A possible exoplanet or disk feature was detected with the Large Binocular Telescope. However, another study failed to find examples of points sources found in earlier studies.

References

Taurus (constellation)
A-type main-sequence stars
Herbig Ae/Be stars
036112
025793